Traditional Vietnamese musical instruments are the musical instruments used in the traditional and classical musics of Vietnam. They comprise a wide range of string, wind, and percussion instruments, used by both the Viet majority as well as the nation's ethnic minorities.

Strings

Plucked
 - monochord zither: often tuned C3, though tuning varies
 - long-necked three-stringed lute with trapezoidal body: tuned G3 C4 
 (also called ,  or ) - moon-shaped two-string lute: no fixed tuning; strings are tuned a 4th, 5th, or 7th (minor), derived from the Chinese 
 - two-string lute derived from the Chinese 
Đàn tam - fretless lute derived from the Chinese  with snakeskin-covered body and three strings: tuned F3 C4 F4
 - long zither derived from the Chinese 
 - pear-shaped lute with four strings derived from the Chinese ; tuned C4 F4 G4 C5
Đàn tứ (also called đàn đoản): short-necked round-bodied lute derived from the Chinese yueqin or, beginning in the 20th century, a square-shaped, flat-backed, 4-string lute with short neck, tuned C3 G3 D4 A4
 - long-necked lute with a gourd body and two or three silk strings derived from the Chinese Zhuang ; used by the Tay, Nung, and Thai ethnic groups
 - fretted zither with a body made of bamboo and a gourd resonator; used by minority ethnic groups in the Central Highlands
 - tube zither with a bamboo body; used by minority ethnic groups in the Central Highlands

Bowed
 - two-stringed vertical violin with coconut resonator derived from the Chinese 
 - two-stringed vertical violin with wooden resonator;  derived from the Chinese , as in 
 - two-stringed vertical violin derived from the Chinese 
 (also spelled  or ) - bowed monochord; played by the Jarai people of the Central Highland

Struck
 - hammered dulcimer with 36 metal strings derived from the Chinese 
Đàn t'rưng: Highland Central bamboo xylophone.

Wind

Flutes
 (also called ) - transverse flute made of bamboo or hardwood

Oboes
 - class of double reed instruments similar to the oboe and the Indian shehnai
 - conical oboe with gourd-shaped wooden bell
 - conical oboe with metal bell; used for funeral music in northern Vietnam

Clarinets
 - double clarinet similar to the Middle Eastern ; used in courtship context mainly within the Mường people.

Free reed mouth organs
Đing nǎm - free-reed mouth organ with gourd body and bamboo pipes; played by Highland people
 - free-reed mouth organ with gourd body and bamboo pipes; played by upland minorities
 - Vietnamese equivalent to the Khaen from Laos, Thailand and Cambodia.

Horns
 - valveless brass trumpet
 ("snail") - conch trumpet
 - Buffalo horn

Percussion

Drums
 - drum played with sticks
  - bass drum
  - rice drum
 Dong Son drum (also called ) - bronze drum played by the Dong Son culture in ancient times
 (also called  - drum used by the H'mong ethnic group for funeral music

Tuned percussion

 - a set of L-shaped flat stone chimes used in ancient court music; derived from the Chinese 
 - tuned gong (comes in both flat and knobbed varieties)
 - set of three small, high-pitched flat gongs in a frame; used primarily in  music
 - bamboo xylophone
 - lithophone, commonly having 9+ stone bars,  in length. It is believed the instrument dates back to 1000 BC. Also called  (M'nong people),  (M'nong people),  (Mạ people).

Untuned percussion
 - castanets
 - metal woodblock
 - clapper made from bamboo or hardwood
 - coin clapper
 - clapper
 - woodblock

Other
 - jaw harp
 - Bamboo tube xylophone; hands are clapped near ends of tubes to produce musical tones
The instrument has twenty-three -long wire strings attached to a bamboo tube with a metal hose-clamp around the top rim. A , rectangular olive oil tin, which acts as a resonator, is clamped to the base of the tube. The instrument is capable of playing both Vietnamese and Western music. The instrument can be seen and recordings of it being played by its creator can be heard at the National Museum of Australia.
 - Vietnamese bell

See also
Music of Vietnam
Space of Gong culture in the Central Highlands of Vietnam

References

External links 

The traditional music and instruments of Vietnam 
Comprehensive listing of Vietnamese musical instruments
Hybrid